Johann Georg Stauffer (also Johann Georg Staufer; January 26, 1778, in Vienna – January 24, 1853) was an Austrian luthier and the most important Viennese luthier of his time.

Life
Stauffer was born in the Viennese suburb of Weißgerber, the son of Mathias Stauffer, a labourer from Weyregg am Attersee. He studied under the luthier Franz Geissenhof. In June 1800 he took the Vienna oath of citizenship and in May 1802 he married Josepha Fischer in the Schottenkirche, Vienna. He took over the workshop of Ignaz Christian Bartl. Initially he built instruments modeled after the Italian guitar masters Giovanni Battista Fabricatore and Gaetano Vinaccia, he then developed several variants, typical of his own guitar style (see section Instruments).

In 1813/14, he applied for the vacant position of Court Luthier ("Hofgeigenmacher") but Johann Martin Stoss was preferred. From 1830-1836 Stauffer was also active as a music publisher. He devoted more time to his inventions, which is probably the reason for the beginning of his serious financial problems. In 1829 he made representations to the City Council for an advance of 1,000 guilders. In 1831/32 his financial troubles continued and he was finally arrested for debt. He then worked temporarily in the workshop of his son Johann Anton Stauffer, before settling for a short time in Košice (now in Slovakia). The last period of his life Stauffer spent in Vienna's St. Marx citizens care home, where he could continue to work in a small workshop on his ideas for the guitar and other instruments. There he developed several guitars with completely new concepts (such as guitars with an oval body and double back), which were always labeled "According to the latest acoustic improvement of Johann Georg Stauffer manufactured in Vienna, Landstrasse 572". In 1853 he finally died impoverished, of paralysis of the lungs.

Johann Georg Stauffer had three sons:
the pianist Franz Stauffer (March 25, 1803 - after 1846).
the luthier and pianist Johann Anton Stauffer (June 12, 1805 - October 28, 1871), who took over his father's workshop in 1833, but from 1836 onwards built under his own name.
Alois Stauffer (June 7, 1806 - June 23, 1806)

Instruments 

The "Viennese guitar" as built by Johann Georg Stauffer is a gut string guitar with a curved back, narrower waist and bridge pins. In 1822 Stauffer and Johann Ertl received an imperial commission for improvement of the guitar, focusing on the extension of the fingerboard, above (not attached to) the soundboard, the development of machine heads and the use of embedded metal frets.

By 1825/30, the instruments usually had a headstock in a figure eight shape (similar in shape to the guitar's body). In 1825 Stauffer invented the machine heads named after him: a metal plate with an asymmetrical "scroll" headstock, machine heads with worm gears mounted on the plate, arranged in a single line on the upper side of the head stock (six-in-line). This "Stauffer" headstock and design was reproduced by his son Anton, and copied by many luthiers in the 19th century. The asymmetrical headstock is variously referred to as being shaped like a "scroll" (a violin scroll in profile), a "snail", and a "Persian slipper". The Stauffer-style scroll headstock and tuning machines have been in use since the 19th century and continue to be used on guitar-related instruments in Central Europe such as larger tamburica. As of 2018, Stauffer style tuning machines are still made by some companies, and some luthiers continue to make “Viennese guitars”.

In 1823 J. G. Stauffer built his Arpeggione, an instrument with characteristics of the guitar and the cello.  Composer Franz Schubert (1797-1828), who also had a Stauffer guitar, wrote a sonata for the Arpeggione, an otherwise almost unnoticed instrument (see Sonata for Arpeggione and Piano in A minor (D 821)). Stauffer also built Terz guitars, the Contraguitar, and experimented with new forms of violin. The luthier Peter Teufelsdorfer, based in the Hungarian city of Pest was for some time in dispute with Stauffer over some of his inventions, which Teufelsdorfer said he had developed himself (but which may have been invented independently).

Stauffer and CF Martin 
Christian Frederick Martin, was born in 1796 in Markneukirchen, Germany, a centre for instrument making. Martin first studied with his father, Johann Georg Martin, a cabinet maker. At 15 years of age, he went to Vienna for an apprenticeship with Stauffer, and in 1825, Martin married Ottilie Kühle, the daughter of the Viennese harp maker Karl Kühle.

Martin remained in Vienna until at least 1827, after which he returned to his hometown and opened his own shop. After a long dispute with the guild of luthiers regarding the rights of cabinet makers to build guitars, Martin emigrated to the United States of America, where he introduced the mechanism developed by Stauffer and founded Martin Guitars. In 2008, the 175th anniversary of the Martin Company, the company released a tribute guitar: the "Martin 00 Stauffer 175th".

Further reading 
earlyromanticguitar.com, "Builders of the early 19th Century: Johann Georg Staufer" , 2013
Rudolf Hopfner: "Johann Georg Staufer", in: Die Musik in Geschichte und Gegenwart, Personenteil, Band 15, Kassel, 2006, S. 1350f.
Erik Pierre Hofmann, Pascal Mougin, Stefan Hackl: Stauffer & Co. - The Viennese guitar of the 19th Century, Germolles sur Grosne, 2011 (Editions Les Robins)  
Stefan Hackl: Die Gitarre in Österreich - Von Abate Costa bis Zykan, Innsbruck/Wien/Bozen, 2011
Michael Lorenz:  "Stauffer Miscellanea", Vienna 2014

References 

Austrian luthiers
1778 births
1853 deaths
Businesspeople from Vienna
Music in Vienna